Longages is a large village and commune in the Haute-Garonne department in southwestern France. It is best known for the castle which dominates the village.

Population

Geography
The commune is bordered by seven other communes: Lavernose-Lacasse to the north, Noé to the east, Capens to the southeast, Carbonne to the south, Peyssies to the southwest, Bois-de-la-Pierre to the west, and finally by Bérat to the northwest.

Sights
The Château Sainte-Marie is a privately-owned castle dating from the second half of the 16th century, modified and altered during the 19th century. It is listed as a historic site by the French Ministry of Culture in 1984.

Transport
Longages-Noé station has rail connections to Toulouse, Pau and Tarbes.

See also
Communes of the Haute-Garonne department

References

Communes of Haute-Garonne